Blue Band (known as Rama in Poland, Germany, Hungary and Czech republic) is a brand of margarine, cheese spreads, and vegetable fat spreads. Originally a Dutch brand developed by Van den Bergh it remains widely available in Germany, where it has been sold since 1924. It is produced by Upfield except in southern Africa, and by Remgro-owned Siqalo Foods in southern Africa.

History
Blue Band was developed as a premium quality margarine.

References

External links
 

Margarine brands
Former Unilever brands
Upfield (company) brands
Spreads (food)